Abé (also spelled Abbé, Abbey, Abi) is a language of uncertain classification within the Kwa branch of the Niger–Congo family. It is spoken in Ivory Coast.

The dialects of Abé are Tioffo, Morie, Abbey-Ve, and Kos.

In 1995 there were estimated to be 170,000 speakers, primarily in the Department of Agboville.

Phonology

Consonants

Vowels 

Abé demonstrates a tendency towards vowel harmony, with regards to both placement (front vs. back) and +/-ATR. /a/ does not participate in this system.

References

External links

Abé basic lexicon at the Global Lexicostatistical Database
 Listen to a sample of Abé from Global Recordings Network

Languages of Ivory Coast
Lagoon languages